Asclepias macrosperma (dwarf milkweed) is a perennial plant in the family Apocynaceae found in the Colorado Plateau and Canyonlands region of the southwestern United States.

Description

Growth pattern

Leaves and stems
Leaves and stems are densely covered with hair.

Inflorescence and fruit
It blooms from April to June.
Flowers are in clusters at the ends of stems, with 5 greenish-white downward bent petals and 5 greenish-white pouch-like sacs.

Seedpods are shaped like spindles.

Habitat and range
It can be found from mixed desert shrub up to pinyon juniper woodland communities.

Ecological and human interactions
"Macro" + "sperma" means "large" + "seed".

It was first collected at Arches National Park in 1893.

References

macrosperma